The following is the list of squads that took part in the men's water polo tournament at the 1964 Summer Olympics.

CF=Centre Forward
CB=Centre Back
D=Defender
GK=Goalkeeper

Australia
The following players represented Australia.

 Michael Withers
 Tom Hoad
 Ian Mills
 Ted Pierce
 Nicky Barnes
 Leon Wiegard
 Les Nunn
 Stan Hammond
 Bill McAtee
 Graeme Samuel
 William Phillips

Belgium
The following players represented Belgium.

 Jacques Caufrier
 Bruno De Hesselle
 Karel De Vis
 Roger De Wilde
 Frank D'Osterlinck
 Nicolas Dumont
 André Laurent
 Léon Pickers
 Joseph Stappers
 Johan Van Den Steen

Brazil
The following players represented Brazil.

 Rodney Bell
 Ivo Carotini
 Paulo Carotini
 Osvaldo Cochrane Filho
 Luiz Daniel
 Márvio dos Santos
 João Gonçalves Filho
 Adhemar Grijó Filho
 Ney Nogueira
 Pedro Pinciroli Júnior
 Aladar Szabo

Egypt
The following players represented Egypt.

 Mohamed Khalil
 Mohamed Abid Soliman
 Moukhtar Hussain El-Gamal
 Amin Abdel Rahman
 Sami El-Sayed
 Hazem Kourched
 Ashraf Gamil
 Adel El-Moalem
 Mamadou Amir

Hungary
The following players represented Hungary.

 Miklós Ambrus
 László Felkai
 János Konrád
 Zoltán Dömötör
 Tivadar Kanizsa
 Péter Rusorán
 György Kárpáti
 Mihály Mayer
 Dezső Gyarmati
 Dénes Pócsik
 András Bodnár
 Ottó Boros

Italy
The following players represented Italy.

 Dante Rossi
 Giuseppe D'Altrui
 Eraldo Pizzo
 Gianni Lonzi
 Franco Lavoratori
 Rosario Parmegiani
 Mario Cevasco
 Eugenio Merello
 Alberto Spinola
 Danio Bardi
 Giancarlo Guerrini
 Fritz Dennerlein

Japan
The following players represented Japan.

 Mineo Kato
 Hachiro Arakawa
 Takashi Yokoyama
 Kazuya Takeuchi
 Yoji Shimizu
 Shigenobu Fujimoto
 Koki Takagi
 Keisuke Satsuki

Netherlands
The following players represented the Netherlands.

 Henk Hermsen
 Bram Leenards
 Wim van Spingelen
 Gerrit Wormgoor
 Fred van Dorp
 Harry Vriend
 Nico van der Voet
 Wim Vriend
 Hans Muller
 Jan Bultman
 Ben Kniest

Romania
The following players represented Romania.

 Mircea Ştefănescu
 Anatol Grinţescu
 Alexandru Szabo
 Ştefan Kroner
 Nicolae Firoiu
 Gruia Novac
 Cornel Mărculescu
 Emil Mureşan
 Aurel Zahan
 Iosif Culineac

Soviet  Union
The Soviet Union entered a squad of eleven players. They scored 15 goals.

Head coach: Andrey Kistyakovsky and Evgeny Semenov

United States
The following players represented the United States.

 Tony van Dorp
 Ron Crawford
 Dave Ashleigh
 Ned McIlroy
 Charles McIlroy
 Stan Cole
 Bob Saari
 Dan Drown
 Ralph Whitney
 George Stransky

United Team of Germany
The following players represented the United Team of Germany.

 Peter Schmidt
 Hubert Höhne
 Siegfried Ballerstedt
 Edgar Thiele
 Klaus Schulze
 Jürgen Thiel
 Klaus Schlenkrich
 Heinz Mäder
 Dieter Vohs
 Jürgen Kluge
 Heinz Wittig

Yugoslavia
The following players represented Yugoslavia.

 Milan Muškatirović
 Ivo Trumbić
 Vinko Rosić
 Zlatko Šimenc
 Božidar Stanišić
 Ante Nardeli
 Zoran Janković
 Mirko Sandić
 Frane Nonković
 Ozren Bonačić
 Karlo Stipanić

References

External links
 Olympic Report
 

1964 Summer Olympics